The Ghost is a 2022 Indian Telugu-language action thriller film written and directed by Praveen Sattaru. The film stars Nagarjuna and Sonal Chauhan while Gul Panag, Anikha Surendran, Manish Chaudhari, Ravi Varma, and Srikanth Iyengar play supporting roles.

Principal photography of the film began in February 2021 and ended in August 2022 with filming taking place in Hyderabad, Ooty and Dubai. The Ghost was released worldwide on 5 October 2022 and received mixed to negative reviews from critics where it was declared as a box-office bomb.

Plot 
Vikram Naidu is an Interpol field agent, in Dubai, who suffers from anger management and nightmares, about a riot that took place in 1984 in New Delhi, in which his mother was killed, when he was 10 years old. During a mission to save an Indian business mogul's son, along with Priya, Vikram's steadfastness in the mission causes the boy to get shot and killed. After this incident, Vikram develops a guilt complex and becomes wild with rage. He eventually breaks-up with Priya, as a result. 

5 years later, Vikram has retired from the Interpol, and works as a freelance agent, occasionally helping the Interpol with their missions. During a session with his psychiatrist, Dr. Iyer, he reveals that post their break-up, Priya moved back to India and joined the NCB, in Mumbai. He also reveals to her that he received a call from his estranged sister and corporate businesswomen, Anupama 'Anu' Nair, who runs the business conglomerate, Nair Group, after 20 years. Vikram leaves to Ooty and reminisces his life of getting adopted by Anu's father, Nagendra Naidu, who was a colonel in the Indian Army, and saved him from getting killed in the riots. Years later, Anu got separated from the both of them, as Naidu denied her relationship with the business mogul, Ashok Nair. As a result, Naidu's health deteriorated. On his deathbed, he made Vikram promise to him, that he will protect and look after Anu. 

After reaching Anu's estate in Ooty, Vikram meets Anu, who reveals that she was receiving death threats and fears that her daughter, Adithi, is in danger, as her personal bodyguards are also not trustworthy. Anu requests Vikram to protect Adithi, where Vikram tells her to appoint him as Adithi's bodyguard. Vikram begins his investigation by checking into Ashok Nair's family, while Anu leaves for a business trip. Vikram slowly begins to change Adithi's behaviour and habits. Adithi and her friends divert Vikram and leave for a trip to Goa. While partying with her friends, Adithi and her friends are sedated and kidnapped, but Vikram, having learnt of their location, narrowly saves them. Later, Adithi reveals that she knows about Vikram. One day, Vikram and Adithi are attacked in a bomb blast, which was meant for Adithi, at Anu's estate. Anu gets killed in a car accident. 

It is revealed that after the mission in Dubai, Vikram went on a killing spree and had vanquished many gangsters and criminals in the underworld, where he was referred to as the Ghost. The remaining gangsters and criminals began to get scared of Vikram's rampage and later surrendered to him, who spared them. Having survived the blast, Vikram and Adithi escape with Priya, where they also learn about Anu's death. Having joined the NCB in Mumbai, Priya reveals that the attack was orchestrated by Scorpion, who runs a business of human trafficking, assassinations, and narcotics. Vikram and Priya suspect Pankaj Nair, Anu's brother-in-law, of hiring Scorpion and hack his phone, only to learn that the company's  shareholder, Harish, and Siran Group heir, Siddhant Nair, were the ones who were involved in the attacks on Adithi and Anu. 

Having guessed that Anu's shares in the company will be nominated to Adithi and that 70% of the board of directors would transfer the shares to Siran Group and merge the company with them, Vikram makes Adithi reveal herself, of being alive, and manages to cancel the meeting. Scorpion learns about Vikram's past from his father, Lala, whose family became his victims, during his rampage. Vikram, Adithi, and Priya interrogate Harish and learn about Scorpion's farmhouse in Narsapur, Karnataka. Priya heads to Scorpion's farmhouse, while Vikram heads to Siddhant's house, with Harish. Having learnt of Vikram's identity, Siddhant attacks Vikram, where Harish is killed in the cross-fire. After an intense combat, Vikram manages to subdue and kill Siddhant. However, he is surrounded by Lala's right-hand man, Sadhu, and his men. But, Lala tells them to leave Vikram, as he received a video of Scorpion getting tortured by Priya. 

Lala arrives at the church, in Goa, where Scorpion is kept and begs Vikram to release him. He reveals that Anu is alive and had survived the accident. He kept her alive, as a bargaining chip, knowing fully that the need will arise. Lala's men bring Anu to the church, while Vikram throws Scorpion's severed head to him. Enraged and distraught, Lala launches a full-on assault, on Vikram and Priya. However, both Vikram and Priya gain the upper-hand, and kill Lala and his men. Anu reunites with Adithi and rejoins the company, by merging Siran Group into Nair Group. She appoints Pankaj as the chairperson of Nair Group. Afterwards, Vikram and Priya are seen riding in a helicopter, speaking to Adithi, as she is now admitted in Cambridge University.

Cast 

Nagarjuna as Vikram Naidu (Vicky), an Interpol field agent and Anupama's adopted brother
Sonal Chauhan as Priya, Vikram's love interest and NCB officer
Gul Panag as Anupama Nair, Vikram’s sister
Anikha Surendran as Aditi Nair, Anupama Nair's daughter
Manish Chaudhari as Lala
Ravi Varma as Pankaj Nair, Anupama's brother-in-law
Srikanth Iyengar as Harish
Bilal Hossein as Scorpion, Lala's son
Anirudh Balaji as Siddhant Nair
Dushyant Barot
Simmi Ghoshal as Shikha
Vaishnavi Ganatra as Hrithi
Kalyani Natarajan as Dr. Iyer, Vikram's psychiatrist
Jayaprakash as Colonel Nagendra Naidu, Vikram and Anu's father
Raghuvaran as the late Ashok Nair, from a photograph

Production
Sunil Narang of Sri Venkateswara Cinemas initially wanted to remake the Hindi film Raid (2018) in Telugu with Nagarjuna. Since Narang was also interested in making a full-length action with the film, director Praveen Sattaru conceptualized a new script which features Nagarjuna as a retired RAW officer. Nagarjuna has learnt Krav Maga and Katana sword fighting for this film. The film was officially launched in February 2021 with a traditional pooja ceremony in Secunderabad.  The title of the film was announced as The Ghost through a first look poster on 29 August 2021, coinciding with Nagarjuna's birthday. Gul Panag is cast in the role of billionaire who is a sister of Nagarjuna's character. The film marks Panag's debut in Telugu cinema.

Kajal Aggarwal was first signed in to play a major role but she opted out due to her pregnancy and was soon replaced by Amala Paul in October 2021. Paul quit the film a month later due to creative differences with the director. Mehreen Pirzada was also approached but she was not finalized due to remuneration issues. Jacqueline Fernandez was cast in the role, however, Fernandez also walked out of the film in January 2022. She was ultimately replaced by Sonal Chauhan. Principal photography of the film began in February 2021 in Hyderabad with an action sequence. However, the shooting was halt due the second wave of COVID-19 pandemic. The second schedule of the film began in first week of March 2022 in Dubai and ended on 30 March 2022. The filming then took place in Ooty in April 2022. The shooting of the film was wrapped up by August 2022.

Music
The songs and musical score were composed by Bharatt-Saurabh and Mark K. Robin.

Release
The film was theatrically released on 5 October 2022, coinciding with Vijayadashami. The film was also dubbed in Tamil and released as Ratchan: The Ghost.Before the films release, it received a U/A certificate even though it has intense action sequences.

Home media 
The satellite rights of the film were sold to Star Maa whilst the digital rights of the film were sold to Netflix. The film was digitally streamed on Netflix from 2 November 2022 in Telugu and dubbed versions of Tamil, Malayalam, Kannada and Hindi languages.

Reception 
The Ghost received negative reviews from critics and audience.

Soundarya Athimuthu of The Quint rated the film 2.5 out of 5 stars and wrote "Nagarjuna impresses us with his style and swag but the rest of the characters and the screenplay, not so much". Janani K of India Today rated the film 2 out of 5 stars and wrote "The Ghost is an action-heavy film and most of the action sequences do justice to it. The lack of solid emotional connect and a ridiculous climax undo everything that had been built so far". Neeshita  Nyayapati of The Times of India gave a rating of 2.5 out of 5 stars and wrote "There are moments in The Ghost that will test your patience. You might also walk away feeling that it was a wasted opportunity to have a story that can be fleshed out better". Balakrishna Ganeshan of The News Minute rated the film 2 out of 5 stars and wrote "While director Praveen Sattaru’s The Ghost has some slick action sequences, there is no compelling story, which is made worse by a contrived screenplay". Pinkvilla gave a rating of 2.5 out of 5 stars and wrote "Nagarjuna’s action thriller doesn't give us breathtaking, tense action" Manoj Kumar R  of The Indian Express rated the film 1 out of 5 stars and wrote "The Ghost is neither cheeky as Mr. & Mrs. Smith nor entertaining as John Wick. It's a 150-minute wannabe neo-noir action-thriller that tests our patience". Haricharan Pudipeddi of The Hindustan Times stated "Nagarjuna's action thriller has a predictable plot but is salvaged by some never-seen-before action sequences and the actor's charisma".

References

External links 
 

Films shot in Hyderabad, India
Indian action thriller films
2020s Telugu-language films
2022 action thriller films
Indian gangster films
Indian crime action films
Films about criminals
Films about corruption in India
Films about organised crime in India
Indian avant-garde and experimental films
Crime films based on actual events
Films about terrorism in India
Films set in Hyderabad, India
Films shot in Telangana
Films set in Goa
Films shot in Dubai
Films shot in Ooty
Films about the Research and Analysis Wing
Films directed by Praveen Sattaru